Pavsacha Nibandh is an Indian Marathi-language short film directed by Nagraj Manjule. It is produced by Balkrishna Manjule, Sheshraj Manjule and Gargee Kulkarni. Film won the National Film Award for Best Non-Feature Film Direction and Audiography in Non-feature Film category at 65th National Film Awards in 2018. It was released on 15 July 2020 and available for streaming on ZEE5.

Plot 
A small boy is given a school assignment to write an essay on monsoons and all its numerous rewards. On his way back to his thatched-roof house at one end of this small village in the Western Ghats, he runs into his father lying drunk on the road.  Here, we see his family struggle to get through this day when the rain won't let it. This boy has to finish his essay in time for school the next day.

Cast 

 Meghraj Shinde
 Gargee Kulkarni
 Sheshraj Manjule
 Rahi Manjule

Production

Development 
Seven years after Pistulya, Pavsacha Nibandh is Nagaraj Majule's second short film. Manjule started the production of the film in 2017 and the post-production of the film was completed in 2018.

Filming 
Pavsacha Nibandh was shot over seven and a half days at Pavana village, near Pune in Maharashtra and some locations in the Western Ghats.

Awards

National awards  
Best Direction in Non-Feature Film - Nagraj Manjule
Best Audiography in Non-feature Film - Avinash Sonwane

Release 
Pavsacha Nibandh was scheduled to be digitally aired on 15 July 2020 on ZEE5.

References

External links 

  
 Pavsacha Nibandh on ZEE5
Indian short films
Indian short stories
Short films by country
2020 short films